Matheus Pucinelli de Almeida (born 1 April 2001) is a Brazilian tennis player.

Pucinelli de Almeida has a career high ATP singles ranking of World No. 190 achieved on 26 September 2022. He also has a career high ATP doubles ranking of World No. 251 achieved on 9 May 2022.

Pucinelli de Almeida won the 2019 French Open – Boys' doubles title.

Career
Pucinelli de Almeida made his ATP main draw debut at the 2022 Chile Open after receiving entry from the qualifying draw.

National representation

Davis Cup

Puccinelli was first nominated to play for Brazil in Davis Cup in September 2021 against Lebanon. Pucinelli made his debut in Davis Cup against Roey Tabet and won in straight sets which allowed the Brazilian team to confirm the 4-0 tie and advance into the 2022 Davis Cup Qualifying Round. 
Currently, Puccinelli sports a 1–0 record in Davis Cup matches. He has played only singles matches thus far.

ATP Challenger and ITF Futures finals

Singles: 6 (3-3)

Doubles: 6 (3–3)

Junior Grand Slam Finals

Doubles: 1 (1 title)

References

External links

2001 births
Living people
Brazilian male tennis players
French Open junior champions
Grand Slam (tennis) champions in boys' doubles
Sportspeople from Campinas
21st-century Brazilian people